Andre Rand (born Frank Rostum Rushan; March 11, 1944, also referred to in the media as "Cropsey") is an American convicted kidnapper of two children and suspected serial killer, currently serving two twenty-five years to life sentences in prison. He is eligible for parole in 2037. He is the subject of the 2009 documentary Cropsey which states that he may have been the source of the "Cropsey" legend.

Biography

Early life
Rand was born Frank Rostum Rushan. The origins of the name "Andre Rand" are unknown. According to his younger  sister in the 2009 documentary Cropsey, neither she nor Rand were sexually or physically abused as children. His father died on March 27, 1958 when Rand was 14.  His mother was institutionalized at Pilgrim Psychiatric Center in Brentwood, New York, where Rand and his sister would visit her as teenagers.

Willowbrook State School
Between 1966 and 1968, using the last name "Bruchette," Rand worked as a custodian, orderly and physical therapy aide at Willowbrook State School - later renamed the Staten Island Development Center.

Early criminal record
On May 5, 1969, Rand was arrested in the South Bronx for kidnapping and attempting to rape a 9-year-old girl. He enticed the 9-year-old Bronx girl into his car and drove her to a vacant lot. He removed his clothes and hers, but a passing police car interrupted the crime. Charged with attempted rape, Rand pleaded guilty to sexual abuse and was sentenced to four years. He served sixteen months in prison, gaining parole in January 1972, and legally changed his name to "Andre Rand," logging three more arrests by the end of the decade for "minor" offenses, including burglary. In 1979, he was accused of raping a young woman and a 15-year-old girl, but neither pressed charges. In 1983, Rand picked up a group of eleven children from the Young Men's Christian Association (YMCA) located on Staten Island in a school bus, purchased a meal for them without the consent of any of their parents, and took them to the Newark Liberty International Airport in the state of New Jersey.  None of the children were harmed in this encounter, but Rand was apprehended and served ten months in jail for unlawful imprisonment.

Alleged victims
On July 7, 1972, 5-year-old Alice Pereira vanished from the area around the Tysens Lane Apartments, which are located in the 600 block of Tysens Lane in the Staten Island neighbourhood of New York City. With her brother, Alice was playing in the building's lobby. She disappeared around 3:30 p.m. after her brother briefly left her alone. After that, Alice might have been seen in a park close to the apartment complex in the Island's New Dorp neighbourhood. She has not been seen or heard from since. At 6:15 p.m., her mother reported her missing. At the time of her disappearance, her parents were divorced. She lived with her mother, and her father lived in Manhattan. Authorities at first believed that Alice's father had taken her, but he was later cleared as a suspect. Andre Rand is the prime suspect in Alice's case. He worked as a painter in Tysens Lane Apartments at the time of Alice's disappearance.

22-year-old Sylvia Alice Lwowski was last seen in Staten Island, New York on September 6, 1975. That evening, she went to the movies with Charles Joseph Cirronella, her fiancé. He claimed that during a fight, Lwowski hurled her glasses against the dashboard of the car and walked out, leaving it on Richmond Avenue not far from the K-Mart Plaza. She has not been seen or heard from since and foul play is suspected. Rand resided in a campsite near to where she was last seen.

Audrey Lyn Nerenberg, 18, was last seen leaving her family's home in the 1200 block of Ryder Street in the Canarsie neighbourhood of Brooklyn, New York City on July 5, 1977. The house was close to Flatlands Avenue, Kings Highway, and Flatbush Avenue. Nerenberg informed her mother that she would be returning immediately after travelling two blocks to get cigarettes, but she has never been heard from again. Later in the day, Nerenberg's father got a call from an unidentified person. The person claimed he abducted Nerenberg and instructed her father to collect as much money as possible before he called back. Her father contacted the FBI and the agency sent conspicuously dressed officials to the Nerenbergs' home. The agents left after the caller failed to communicate within three hours. They did not try to track down the call. The caller might have been someone from the Flatbush neighbourhood, perhaps someone the family knew, who saw as the officials entered their home, according to Nerenberg's father. Nerenberg's hebephrenic schizophrenia had caused her to spend brief periods of time in numerous New York City healthcare institutions between 1974 and 1977. She has been a patient at Hillside Medical Center in Queens, Gracie Square Hospital in Manhattan, and Kings County Hospital in Brooklyn. Nerenberg was an outpatient at Kingsboro Psychiatric Center in Brooklyn at the time she disappeared. She was not carrying any identification or medication with her at the time she was last seen. Nerenberg travelled with her family to Staten Island during the evening of July 4, 1977, the day before she vanished. At the former Jerry Lewis Theater on Forest Avenue in Mariners Harbor on the Island, they watched a movie. The theatre was adjacent to a campsite that Andre Rand had previously visited. There is suspicion that Nerenberg may have returned to the Island on July 5 while feeling disoriented and may have crossed paths with Rand as a result of her mental illness, which occasionally caused her to repeat her actions. He has not been officially connected to Nerenberg's case.

Ethel Louise Atwell, 42, was last seen on October 24, 1978, at the Staten Island Developmental Center (formerly known as the Willowbrook State School), the facility for mentally handicapped children where she worked as a physical therapy assistant. At 6:00 a.m. in the morning, she arrived, parked behind Building 47, and locked her car. Before she could get from the parking lot into her building, two female employees inside the building heard a male voice outside say "Come on, come on," and Atwell say "No, you'll beat me." Then she screamed. The employees called the police after hearing the screams. The parking lot was still dark, the streetlights were off, and it was difficult for them to see anything. Atwell's tan pocketbook, one earring, one black shoe, three black coat buttons, and part of her set of dentures were all discovered by responding authorities along the left side of her locked car. About 75 feet away in the woods, her keys were discovered. Atwell has never been seen or heard from again despite a thorough search of the region. Rand had ties to the Willowbrook State School and is also considered a suspect in the rape and murder of Shin Lee, another Willowbrook aide. 44-year-old Lee was a nurse who had gone missing earlier in 1978 from Willowbrook under similar circumstances to Atwell. She was reported missing on July 20 and last seen that day walking home from Building 11 of the Centre toward her Sea View home close to midnight. She was found murdered by strangulation and buried in a shallow grave near a wooded area on facility grounds on August 6, only two month prior to Ethel's disappearance. Ethel Atwell and Shin Lee are considered victims of Rand, however, there is no concrete evidence linking Rand to either incident.

Brenda Cecilia Crowley, 16, resided with her mother in the 100 block of Harbor Road in Mariners Harbor in the New York City borough of Staten Island in 1980. She was last seen on March 1 of that year. Her mother claimed she had filed a missing persons report with law enforcement, but she had not actually done so. In 1994, Brenda's sister finally made a report. In 1981, a year after her daughter vanished, Brenda's mother was killed by a male acquaintance who strangled her to death. Sometime after 1980, their house caught fire. Brenda had previously attended Curtis High School as a special education student, but she stopped going there in February 1980 and was expelled for being AWOL (absent without leave). In family court, she is the subject of an active PINS (person in need of supervision) warrant. The circumstances of her disappearance remain unclear but she matched Rand's preferred victim profile being a young female with intellectual disabilities.

On July 15, 1981, about 9:30 p.m., 7-year-old Holly Ann Hughes was last seen near Richmond Terrace and Park Avenue in the Staten Island neighbourhood of New York City. Her mother sent her to the Port Richmond Deli two blocks away to purchase a bar of Ivory soap, and she was last seen buying it. She never returned home and has never been heard from again. A month after Holly's disappearance, her mother, Holly Cederholm, received a phone call from a man who identified himself as "Sal." Sal informed Cederholm that he was imprisoning the child and asked that they meet so that Cederholm could engage in sex acts for the camera in exchange for Holly's safe return. Cederholm went with detectives to meet Sal at Penn Station in New York City, but he never showed up. She stated that she never believed Sal really had Holly; by this time, she thought Holly was dead. In January 2002, authorities examined the yard of Rand's former Staten Island home on Vreeland Street, but they were unable to find any evidence pertaining to Holly's case. Shortly after Holly vanished, police questioned Rand and searched his car, but they did not prosecute him until twenty years later. Cederholm identified Rand's voice as the same voice she heard during the extortion phone call. Witnesses claimed to have seen Rand's green Volkswagen circle the business where Holly vanished in 1981. Some claimed they even saw Holly in Rand's car. He acknowledged playing hide-and-seek with Holly on the day she vanished and gave her money to buy soap because she was "filthy," but he claims to have left her before she vanished. Authorities also determined that Rand's aunt lived in the same Port Richmond apartment building where Holly's family resided in 1981. The defence team for Rand insisted that their client was innocent and that the people who said they saw Holly in his car were wrong or lying. His attorneys made an effort to cast doubt on the child's family. Prior to her disappearance, Holly had been the subject of a custody dispute between her parents and had been taken by both of them at one time or another, but her parents have been ruled out as suspects in her 1981 disappearance. Rand was convicted of kidnapping Holly in October 2004. Rand was never charged with the child's murder due to a lack of evidence. He was sentenced to twenty-five years to life in prison. He is also serving twenty-five years to life for the Schweiger kidnapping. The second sentence made it extremely unlikely that he would ever be freed.

On August 14, 1983, twelve days after Rand was released from prison, 11-year-old Tiahease Jackson was last seen leaving the Mariner's Harbor Motel on Forest Avenue in the Staten Island neighbourhood of New York City.  She lived in the hotel with her mother and three siblings, the family having moved there after getting burned out of their apartment. The Jackson family intended to move to the southern United States. At 1:30 p.m., while Tiahease's mother was asleep, another resident of the hotel sent Tiahease out to purchase chicken wings from the Crown Supermarket in the 900 block of Richmond Avenue. Tiahease never returned to the hotel and has never been heard from again. Her mother woke up at 4:30 p.m., and, discovering her daughter had been missing for three hours, immediately called police. Having both passed lie detector tests, Tiahease's mother and uncle were ruled out as suspects in her disappearance. Andre Rand had a campsite at the Baron Hirsch Cemetery less than half a mile from the Mariner's Harbor Motel, and Tiahease's mother said she had seen a man matching his description loitering in the motel's parking lot. Although Rand was interrogated, no charges were filed.

Hank Gafforio, a 22-year-old native of Staten Island, was last seen at the Spa Lounge in the Port Richmond neighbourhood at 4:00 a.m. on June 9, 1984. He had gone out drinking and first went to Mugs Away, but was declined service. After that, he went to the Spa Lounge and remained there until it closed. Before going missing, he was spotted at the diner with Andre Rand in the early morning hours. Gafforio vanished without a trace. At 7:00 p.m., he was reported missing. Gafforio was described as being “slow” and had an intelligence quotient in the 70s. Gafforio lived with his parents and three brothers in the 90 block of Heberton Avenue, on the same block as Rand and just around the corner from Holly's residence. His body has never been found.

12-year-old Jennifer Schweiger, born with Down syndrome, was reported missing on July 9, 1987. Witnesses spotted Jennifer walking with Rand. Her body was found underground after a thirty-five day search. While combing the area around Willowbrook State School, a particular spot caught the eye of retired New York City firefighter George Kramer. He returned with the police, the entire body was unearthed from the shallow grave, and the remains were positively identified as those of Schweiger. Police searched the grounds for evidence and found one of Rand’s makeshift campsites in proximity to Schweiger’s grave.

Convictions
In 1988, Andre Rand was charged with the kidnapping and first-degree murder of Jennifer Schweiger. The Staten Island jury could not reach a verdict on the murder charge, but convicted Rand of the first-degree kidnapping charge. He was sentenced to twenty-five years to life in prison. He would have been eligible for parole in 2008 if not convicted of a second kidnapping.

According to the documentary Cropsey, some people along with detectives speculated that Rand may have been involved with Satanism and provided the children to be sacrificed. There were people who also thought that Rand was not alone in the commission of his crimes and many believed he was passing the children around to his friends in the underground network of homeless and mentally disabled people living in the tunnel systems of the former Willowbrook state school.

Officers and inmates at the prison where Rand is currently incarcerated testified regarding conversations in which he allegedly bragged about his paedophiliac exploits. He reportedly confessed Holly's murder to an inmate and compared himself to the serial killer Ted Bundy. Volunteers continue to search the abandoned property twice a year for evidence related to Rand's other alleged victims, but nothing has been discovered. 

In 2004, Rand was again brought to trial, this time charged with the kidnapping of Holly Ann Hughes twenty-three years earlier. There is no statute of limitations in New York for first-degree kidnapping, which made this charge possible. A jury convicted Rand of the kidnapping in October 2004, and he was sentenced to another consecutive twenty-five years to life in prison. He will become eligible for parole in 2037, when he will be 93-years-old. All of his alleged victims vanished from or were murdered in the Staten Island area, with the exception of Nerenberg. Their cases remain unsolved.

See also 
 List of serial killers in the United States

References

1944 births
20th-century American criminals
American male criminals
American people convicted of kidnapping
Criminals from New York City
Living people
Suspected serial killers